Victor Gómez may refer to:

 Victor Gómez (alpine skier) (born 1974), Andorran skier (Victor Gómez Javalera)
 Víctor Gómez (footballer) (born 2000), Spanish footballer (Víctor Gómez Perea)

See also
 Victor Gomes (born 1982), South African football referee (Victor Miguel de Freitas Gomes)